Maurice Scève (c. 1501–c. 1564), was a French poet active in Lyon during the Renaissance period. He was the centre of the Lyonnese côterie that elaborated the theory of spiritual love, derived partly from Plato and partly from Petrarch. This spiritual love, which animated Antoine Héroet's Parfaicte Amye (1543) as well, owed much to Marsilio Ficino, the Florentine translator and commentator of Plato's works.

Scève's chief works are Délie, objet de plus haulte vertu (1544); five anatomical blazons; the elegy Arion (1536) and the eclogue La Saulsaye (1547); and Microcosme (1562), an encyclopaedic poem beginning with the fall of man. Scève's epigrams, which have seen renewed critical interest since the late 19th century, were seen as difficult even in Scève's own day, although Scève was praised by Du Bellay, Ronsard, Pontus de Tyard and Des Autels for raising French poetry to new, higher aesthetic standards.

Scève died sometime after 1560; the exact date of his death is unknown.

Life

Scève is believed to have been born in 1501. His father was a Lyonnese lawyer and municipal officer who served as Lyon's ambassador to the court upon the accession of François I to the throne, giving the family a strong social standing in the city.

The Lyonnese school, of which Scève was the leader, included his friend Claude de Taillemont, Barthélémy Aneau, the physician Pierre Tolet and the women writers Jeanne Gaillarde—placed by Clément Marot on an equality with Christine de Pisan—Pernette du Guillet, Louise Labé, Clémence de Bourges and the poet's sisters, Claudine and Sybille Scève.

Work

Scève's first acclaim as a poet came in 1535, when he sent a pair of blasons to Marot in response to Le Blason du Beau Tétin. Le Sourcil ("The Eyebrow") and La Larme ("The Tear") were submitted as a part of a contest organized by Marot while in exile in Ferrara; the former was judged the winner, gaining notoriety for Scève in both France and Italy. These two poems were published along with others from the contest in 1536. Three additional Scève blasons (Le Front, La Gorge and Le Soupir) were published in the 1539 edition.

Délie, Scève's most notable work, consists of 449 dizains (10-line epigrammes) preceded by a dedicatory huitain (8-line poem) to his mistress ("A sa Délie"). The title is sometimes understood to be an anagram for l'idée ("the idea"). Délie is the first French "canzoniere" or poetic collection modeled after Petrarch's immensely-popular Canzoniere, a series of love poems addressed to a Lady.

Scève was also responsible for the translation of a sentimental novel, Grimalte y Gradissa by Juan de Flores, published as La Déplorable fin de Flamète in 1535, which was inspired by Giovanni Boccaccio.

Scève was a well versed musician as well as a poet; he cared very much for the musical value of the words he used, in this and in his erudition he forms a link between the school of Marot and the Pléiade.

Selected works

English translation
Emblems of Desire: Selections from the "Délie" of Maurice Scève, Richard Sieburth, Editor and Translator. (University of Pennsylvania Press, 2002)

Further reading

Important early literature on the poet includes Édouard Bourciez, La Littérature polie et les mœurs de cour sous Henri II (Paris, 1886); Jacques Pernetti, Recherches pour servir de l'histoire de Lyon (2 vols., Lyon, 1757), and especially F. Brunetière, "Un Précurseur de la Pléiade, Maurice Scève," in his Etudes critiques, vol. vi. (1899).

More recent scholarship includes V. Saunier's two-volume Sorbonne dissertation on the poet (Paris, 1948), as well as three excellent critical editions by Eugène Parturier (Paris, 1916, reissued 2001 with an introduction and bibliography by C. Alduy), I.D McFarlane (Cambridge, 1966) and Gérard Defaux (Geneva, 2004). McFarlane's edition remains authoritative. Critical studies, with various approaches, by Dorothy Coleman, Jerry Nash, Nancy Frelick, Cynthia Skenazi, James Helgeson and Thomas Hunkeler are particularly useful; important articles on the poet have been written by François Rigolot, Enzo Giudici, Edwin Duval, Terence Cave, Gérard Defaux, and Richard Sieburth's "Introduction" to Emblems of Desire: Selections from the "Délie", a work which Sieburth translated and edited (see External links below for link to Sieburth's Introduction available on-line).

A complete annotated bibliography of all works by and on Scève since his lifetime has recently been published (Cécile Alduy, Maurice Scève, Roma: Memini, 2006, 200pp.). It contains in particular all the critical literature, past and present, on Scève and his works.

See also
Enzo Giudici
Louise Labe

References

External links

"Introduction" to Emblems of Desire: Selections from the "Délie" of Maurice Scève by Richard Sieburth, Editor and Translator
Background and digital facsimile of a 1564 edition of Delie At the University of Virginia's Gordon Collection

1500s births
1560s deaths
Writers from Lyon
French poets
French male poets
16th-century French poets